ABBA Oro: Grandes Éxitos is a greatest hits compilation album by ABBA, first released by Polydor in the United States in 1992, in which the songs are sung in Spanish. This album is the Spanish equivalent of their Gold: Greatest Hits album, originally released as Gracias Por La Música in early 1980. It was certified Gold in Argentina.

Oro was followed by ABBA Mas Oro: Mas ABBA Exitos (ABBA More Gold: More ABBA Hits) in 1993 which included five English-language versions plus further tracks in Spanish; the four songs that appeared on the South American versions of Super Trouper ("Andante, Andante" & "Felicidad") and The Visitors ("No Hay A Quien Culpar" & "Se Me Está Escapando"), and it also saw the debut of the previously unreleased Spanish version of "Ring Ring", recorded in 1973 but left in the Polar archives for twenty years.

In 1999, all 15 tracks were finally collected on one CD in the international re-issue of Oro. At that time the recordings were also digitally remastered in 24 bit.
In 2002 this version of Oro was re-released, featuring updated artwork and new liner notes.

Track listing
All songs written and composed by Benny Andersson & Björn Ulvaeus, except where noted.
 "Fernando" (Spanish version) – 4:17
 "Chiquitíta" (Spanish version) – 5:30
 "Gracias por la Música" ("Thank You for the Music") – 3:49
 "La Reina del Baile" ("Dancing Queen") (written by Andersson, Stig Anderson, Ulvaeus) – 4:02
 "Al Andar" ("Move On") (written by Andersson, Anderson, Ulvaeus) – 4:44
 "¡Dame! ¡Dame! ¡Dame!" ("Gimme! Gimme! Gimme! (A Man After Midnight)") – 4:51
 "Estoy Soñando" ("I Have a Dream") – 4:38
 "Mamma Mía" (Spanish version) (written by Andersson, Anderson, Ulvaeus) – 3:34
 "Hasta Mañana" (Spanish version) (written by Andersson, Anderson, Ulvaeus) – 3:09
 "Conociéndome, Conociéndote" ("Knowing Me, Knowing You") (written by Andersson, Anderson, Ulvaeus) – 4:04

Bonus tracks 1999 re-release 
<LI>"Felicidad" ("Happy New Year") – 4:24
<LI>"Andante, Andante" (Spanish version) – 4:39
<LI>"Se Me Está Escapando" ("Slipping Through My Fingers") – 3:52
<LI>"No Hay a Quien Culpar" ("When All Is Said and Done") – 3:13
<LI>"Ring, Ring" (Spanish Version) (written by Andersson, Anderson, Ulvaeus) – 3:00

(P) 1973 (15) / 1979 (2, 7) / 1980 (1, 3 – 6, 8 – 12) / 1981 ( 13–14) Polar Music International AB
The Spanish version of "Dancing Queen" was originally entitled "Reina Danzante", but was retitled "La Reina del Baile" when Oro was released.
Songs 1 – 14 in Spanish translation by Buddy and Mary McCluskey.
Song 15 in Spanish translation by Doris Band.

Personnel

Agnetha Fältskog - lead vocals , co-lead vocals , backing vocals
Anni-Frid Lyngstad - lead vocals , co-lead vocals , backing vocals
Björn Ulvaeus - acoustic guitar, backing vocals
 Benny Andersson – synthesizer, keyboards, backing vocals

Weekly charts

Certifications and sales

References

1993 greatest hits albums
ABBA compilation albums
Polydor Records compilation albums
Spanish-language compilation albums
Albums recorded at Polar Studios
Albums produced by Björn Ulvaeus
Albums produced by Benny Andersson